The list of shipwrecks in March 1830 includes ships sunk, foundered, grounded, or otherwise lost during March 1830.

2 March

4 March

6 March

7 March

8 March

9 March

10 March

11 March

12 March

13 March

15 March

16 March

17 March

18 March

26 March

27 March

29 March

Unknown date

Notes
 Date may have been 16 March 1831.

References

1830-03